Kempa is a 2009 Indian Kannada-language action drama film directed by debutante Jagadish and starring newcomers Santosh and Thanushika.

Cast 
Santosh as Kempa 
Thanushika as Bindu
Pradeep Rawat
Avinash
L. Revannaiah Siddaiah
Ruchita Prasad as journalist
Pragna as Bindu's sister

Production 
The film began production in 2007 under the title Golla. Newcomer Santhosh, son of producer Anekal Balaraj, made his debut with this film. The story is based on a true incident of a shepard's struggle that happened in Gopinatham, the birthplace of Veerappan.

Soundtrack 
The music was composed by Gurukiran.

Reception 
R. G. Vijayasarathy of Rediff.com opined that "Kempa should be watched for the first and the last 20 minutes". A critic from Bangalore Mirror wrote that "Kempa could have been a better film".

References 

2000s Kannada-language films
Indian action drama films